Arthrobacter deserti is a Gram-positive, rod-shaped and non-motile bacterium species from the genus Arthrobacter which has been isolated from desert soil from the Turpan desert in China. The type strain for this specific bacterium is YIM CS25T. Arthrobacter deserti contains lysine in its peptidoglycan layer. This species of Arthrobacter is aerobic. The cells were non-sporulating and rod-to-coccus shaped. The cells are known to use at least 36 different types of carbon sources. The predominant menaquinone is MK-9(H2). The genomic DNA G+C content of the type strain is 68.3mol%.

Characteristics of Arthrobacter deserti 
Morphological, physiological, and biochemical characteristics of Arthrobacter deserti are shown in the Table below. 

Note: + = Positive, - = Negative

References

External links 

Type strain of Arthrobacter deserti at BacDive -  the Bacterial Diversity Metadatabase

Bacteria described in 2016
Micrococcaceae